Caetano Alexandre de Almeida e Albuquerque  (15 April 1824 – 8 September 1916) was a Portuguese colonial administrator and a military officer. He was governor general of Cape Verde from 29 March 1869 until 26 February 1876, succeeding José Guedes de Carvalho e Meneses. He was succeeded by Guilherme Quintino Lopes de Macedo. In June 1876, he was appointed governor general of Angola, succeeding José Baptista de Andrade. He was succeeded by Vasco Guedes de Carvalho e Meneses in July 1878. From 3 December 1878 until 10 April 1882 he was governor-general of Portuguese India.

The main square of Praia, the capital of Cape Verde, is named Praça Alexandre Albuquerque after him. There is a bronze bust of Albuquerque on the square.

See also
List of colonial governors of Cape Verde
List of colonial governors of Angola
List of governors of Portuguese India

Notes

External links

Caetano Alexandre de Almeida e Albuquerque at Geneall

1824 births
1916 deaths
Colonial heads of Cape Verde
Governors of Portuguese Angola
Governors-General of Portuguese India
Portuguese colonial governors and administrators